Rácalmás is a town in Central Transdanubia, in Fejér county, Hungary. Located on the right side of river Danube  around 61 km south of Budapest.

The Name Rácalmás is derived from a Serbian ("Rác" - from medieval "Raška") apple picker. There is also on a Grassed area alongside of a Lake in the Town, A white Tree Called, the Holmar Apple Tree.

Twin towns – sister cities

Rácalmás is twinned with:
 Dransfeld, Germany

References

External links

  in Hungarian
 Related link collection 
 Street map 

Populated places in Fejér County